Bladnoch may refer to:

 Bladnoch, Wigtownshire
 Bladnoch Distillery, and Bladnoch whisky
 River Bladnoch